"Ei" is a song by Finnish pop rock singer-songwriter Maija Vilkkumaa. Released by Warner Music Finland in 2003, it was the B-side to her lead single "Häviän" (I Vanish) from her third studio album Ei, along with the other B-side "Ilosanoma" (Gospel). Written by Vilkkumaa, the song peaked at number three on its debut week on the Finnish Singles Chart and charted for five weeks.

Track listing

Chart performance

References

2003 singles
Maija Vilkkumaa songs
Finnish-language songs
Songs written by Maija Vilkkumaa
2003 songs